Velislav Boev (Bulgarian: Велислав Боев; born 19 December 2003) is a Bulgarian footballer who plays as a defender for Spartak Varna.

Career
Boev is a youth player of Spartak Varna, before moving to Botev Plovdiv and later Ludogorets Razgrad academies and rejoined Spartak to join the first team in 2019 at age 15 years 11 months 18 days. On 11 July 2022 he completed his First League debut in a match against Slavia Sofia.

International career
In September 2022 he received his first call up for Bulgaria U21 for the friendly matches against Hungary U21 and Serbia U21 on 23 and 27 September.

Career statistics

Club

References

External links
 

2003 births
Living people
Bulgarian footballers
Bulgaria youth international footballers
PFC Spartak Varna players
First Professional Football League (Bulgaria) players
Association football defenders